Morten Renå Olsen (born 2 June 1999) is a Norwegian football player who plays as defender for Strømmen .

For the 2018 season he was loaned out to second-tier newcomers Hamarkameratene. In 2019 he was loaned out to Notodden FK, also on the second tier.

References

External links

1999 births
Living people
People from Hurum
Norwegian footballers
Stabæk Fotball players
Hamarkameratene players
Notodden FK players
Strømmen IF players
Eliteserien players
Association football defenders
Norway youth international footballers
Norwegian First Division players
Norwegian Second Division players
Sportspeople from Viken (county)